Barât may refer to:
 Carl Barât (born 6 June 1978), an English musician
 Lucie Barât, a British actress, writer, lyricist and musician